The Dönme were a group of Sabbatean crypto-Jews in the Ottoman Empire who converted outwardly to Islam, but retained their Jewish faith and Kabbalistic beliefs in secret. The movement was centered mainly in Thessaloniki. It originated during and soon after the era of Sabbatai Zevi, a 17th-century Sephardic Jewish Rabbi and Kabbalist who claimed to be the Jewish Messiah and eventually feigned conversion to Islam under threat of death from the Sultan Mehmed IV. After Zevi's forced conversion to Islam, a number of Sabbatean Jews purportedly converted to Islam and became the Dönme. Some Sabbateans lived on into 21st-century Turkey as descendants of the Dönme.

Today it is unclear how many people still call themselves Dönme although some still live in Teşvikiye in Istanbul. Most are buried in the Bülbüldere Cemetery (AKA Selanikliler Mezarlığı or the Cemetery of the Salonicans) in Üsküdar where, unusually, their gravestones feature photographs of the deceased.

Etymology 
The Turkish word dönme (apostate) derives from the verbal root dön- that means "to turn", i.e., "to convert", but in the pejorative sense of "turncoat".

The independent scholar Rıfat Bali defines the term dönme as follows:

The Dönme were sometimes called Selânikli (person from Thessaloniki) or avdetî ("religious convert"). Members of the group referred to themselves as "the Believers", Ḥaberim ("Associates"), or Ba'ale Milḥamah ("Warriors"), while in the town of Adrianople (modern Edirne) they were known as Sazanikos (Turkish for "little carps"), perhaps in reference to the changing outward nature of the fish or perhaps because of the prophecy that Sabbatai Zevi would deliver the Jews under the zodiacal sign of the fish.

The word dönme is also used as a derogatory Turkish word for a transvestite, or someone who is claiming to be someone they are not.

History

Despite their supposed conversion to Islam, the Sabbateans secretly remained close to Judaism and continued to practice Jewish rituals covertly. They recognized Sabbatai Zevi (1626–1676) as the Jewish Messiah, observed certain Jewish commandments with similarities to those in Rabbinic Judaism, and prayed in Hebrew and later in Ladino. They also observed rituals celebrating important events in Zevi's life and interpreted Zevi's conversion in a Kabbalistic way.

The Dönme divided into several branches. The first, the İzmirli, was formed in İzmir (Smyrna) and was the original sect, from which two others eventually split. The first schism created the Jakubi sect, founded by Jacob Querido (ca. 1650–1690), the brother of Zevi's last wife. Querido claimed to be Zevi's reincarnation and a messiah in his own right. The second split from the İzmirli was the result of claims that Berechiah Russo (1695–1740) had inherited a soul known in Turkish as Otman Baba, who was the true reincarnation of Zevi's soul. These allegations gained attention and gave rise to the Karakashi (Turkish), or Konioso (Ladino), branch, the most numerous and strictest branch of the Dönme. Missionaries from the Karakashi/Konioso were active in Poland in the first part of the 18th century and taught Jacob Frank (1726–1791), who later claimed to have inherited Russo's soul. Frank went on to create the Frankist sect, a different non-Dönme Sabbatean group in Eastern Europe. Yet another group, the Lechli, of Polish descent, lived in exile in Thessaloniki and Constantinople.

Some commentators have suggested that several leading members of the Young Turk movement, a group of constitutional monarchist revolutionaries who brought down the Ottoman Empire, were Dönme. At the time of the population exchange in 1923, some of the Thessaloniki Dönme tried to be recognized as non-Muslims to avoid being forced to leave the city. After the foundation of the Turkish Republic in 1923, the Dönme supported Atatürk's reforms. The Dönme helped to establish new trade and industry in the new Republic of Turkey.

One of the leaders of the assassination plot against President Atatürk in İzmir after the establishment of the Turkish Republic was a Dönme named Mehmed Cavid Bey, a founding member of the Committee of Union and Progress (CUP) and the former Minister of Finance of the Ottoman Empire. Convicted after a government investigation, Cavid Bey was hanged on 26 August 1926 in Ankara.

Ideology
The 17th-century Dönme ideology revolved primarily around the Eighteen Precepts, a variation on the Ten Commandments in which the prohibition of adultery is explained as more of a precautionary measure than a ban, likely included to explain the antinomian sexual activities of the Sabbateans. The additional commandments are concerned with defining the kinds of interactions that may occur between the Dönme and the Jewish and Muslim communities. The most basic of these rules of interaction was to prefer relations within the sect to those outside it and to avoid marriage with either Jews or Muslims. In spite of this, they maintained ties with Sabbateans who had not converted and even with Jewish rabbis, who secretly settled disputes concerning Jewish law.

As far as ritual was concerned, the Dönme followed both Jewish and Muslim traditions, shifting between them as necessary for integration into Ottoman society. Outwardly Muslims and secretly Jewish Sabbateans, the Dönme observed traditional Muslim holidays like Ramadan but also kept the Jewish Sabbath, Brit milah and major holidays. Much of Dönme ritual was a combination of various elements of Kabbalah, Sabbateanism, Jewish traditional law and Sufism.

Dönme liturgy evolved as the sect grew and spread. At first, much of their literature was written in Hebrew but, as the group developed, Ladino replaced Hebrew and became not only the vernacular but also the liturgical language. Though the Dönme had divided into several sects, all of them believed that Zevi was the messiah and that he had revealed the true "spiritual Torah" which was superior to the practical earthly Torah. The Dönme celebrated holidays associated with various points in Zevi's life and their own history of conversion. Based at least partially on the Kabbalistic understanding of divinity, the Dönme believed that there was a three-way connection between the emanations of the divine, which engendered much conflict with Muslim and Jewish communities alike. The most notable source of opposition from other contemporary religions was the common practice of exchanging wives between members of the Dönme.

Dönme hierarchy was based on the branch divisions. The Izmirli, made up of the merchant classes and the intelligentsia, topped the hierarchy. Artisans tended to be mostly Karakashi while the lower classes were mostly Jakubi. Each branch had its own prayer community, organised into a "Kahal" or congregation (Hebrew). An extensive internal economic network provided support for lower class Dönme in spite of ideological differences between the different branches.

After the establishment of Israel in 1948, only a few Dönme families migrated to Israel. In 1994, Ilgaz Zorlu, an accountant who claimed to be of Dönme origin on his mother's side, started publishing articles in history journals, in which he revealed his self-proclaimed Dönme identity and presented the Dönme and their beliefs. As the Turkish Chief Rabbinate and Israeli religious authorities did not accept the Dönme as Jews without a lengthy conversion, Zorlu applied to the Istanbul 9th Court of First Instance in July 2000. He requested that his religious affiliation in his Turkish identity card to be changed from "Islam" to "Jew". He won his case. Soon after, the Turkish Beth din accepted him as a Jew. However, as they are not recognized as Jews, Dönme are not eligible for the Israeli Law of Return. For the Portuguese law of return, the decision to recognize dönme as Jews or not is outsourced to local Jewish communities. The Dönme's situation is similar to that of the Falash Mura.

Anti-semitism and alleged political entanglements 
Turkish antisemitism and the canards upon which it relies are centred on the mysterious concept of the Dönme. According to historian Marc David Baer, the phenomenon has deep roots in late-Ottoman history, and its legacy of conspiratorial accusations persisted throughout the history of the Turkish Republic and is kept alive there today. Modern antisemitism tends to present Jews as a ubiquitous, homogenous unit acting undercover via diverse global groups in pursuit of global political and economic control via secretive channels. As a crypto-Sabbatean sect, the Dönme always made an easy target for claims about secret, crypto-Jewish political control and social influence, whether charged with setting in motion political upheaval against the status quo, or accused of shaping an oppressive regime's grip on the status quo.

The Dönme history of Sabbatean theological and ritual secrecy grounded in Jewish tradition, coupled with public observance of Islam, make accusations of secret Jewish control convenient, according to Baer. "Secret Jew," then, takes on a double meaning of being both secretly Jewish and Jews who act secretively to exert control; their secret religious identity in the first place is compatible, for conspiracy theorists, with their secretive influence, especially when they cannot be distinguished from ordinary Turkish Muslims who reside everywhere, and, as Baer argues, when the modern antisemite sees the Jew as necessarily "everywhere." The Dönme's manoeuverings were said to have lain at the heart of the Young Turk Revolution and its overthrow of Sultan Abdul Hamid II, the dissolution of the Ottoman religious establishment, and the founding of a secular republic. Pro-sultan, religious Muslim political opponents painted these events as a global Jewish and Freemasonic plot carried out by Turkey's Dönme. According to their conspiracy theory, Mustafa Kemal Atatürk was a Dönme.

See also 
 Allahdad
 Chala
 Converso
 Marrano
 Neofiti
 Frankism
 Jacob Frank
 History of the Jews in Turkey
 Falash Mura
 Disputation of Paris (1240)
 Disputation of Barcelona (1263)
 Disputation of Tortosa (1413–1414)

References

Bibliography

Further reading
 
 
 

Converts from Judaism
Groups claiming Jewish descent
Islam and Judaism
Islam in Turkey
Jewish Turkish history
Religion in Turkey
Sabbateans
Sephardi Jews topics
Society of Turkey
Turkish words and phrases
Crypto-Jews